Indonesia is competing at the 2013 World Aquatics Championships in Barcelona, Spain between 19 July and 4 August 2013.

Diving

Indonesia qualified seven quota places for the following diving events.

Men

Women

Open water swimming

Indonesia qualified two quota places for the following events in open water swimming.

Swimming

Indonesian swimmers achieved qualifying standards in the following events (up to a maximum of 2 swimmers in each event at the A-standard entry time, and 1 at the B-standard):

Men

Women

Synchronized swimming

Indonesia has qualified a pair synchronized swimmers.

References

External links
Barcelona 2013 Official Site

Nations at the 2013 World Aquatics Championships
2013 in Indonesian sport
Indonesia at the World Aquatics Championships